Lachnaia pseudobarathraea is a species of leaf beetles from the subfamily Cryptocephalinae. It can be found in  Sierra Nevada in Spain.

References

Clytrini
Beetles described in 1898
Taxa named by Julius Weise